Nicolle Gonzales (born March 15, 1980 in Waterflow, New Mexico) is a Navajo certified midwife. She is currently in the process of opening the nation's first Native American birthing center in her home state, New Mexico.

Biography 
She studied at the University of New Mexico. She first received her bachelor's degree in nursing, followed by a master level midwifery degree. She is a member of the American College of Nurse-Midwives and is certified with the American Midwifery Certification Board.

Gonzales trained as a midwife after traumatic experiences during the birth of her first child. Gonzales lives in Santa Fe, New Mexico.

Changing Woman Initiative (CWI)
Gonzales is the founder of Changing Woman Initiative, a non-profit organization which aims to improve the experience of childbirth for indigenous women. The cost alone of child birth can range from $13,000 to $17,000, making it less available for rural, indigenous women. Gonzales aims to cut the costs of birth as well as providing other women's health services to help with the cost of women's health in general. Work has not yet started on the clinic, which is intended to cater to women with Medicaid insurance, or women with no insurance at all. Gonzales hopes to open the center on native land.

References 

1980 births
Living people
Navajo people
American midwives
People from New Mexico
University of New Mexico alumni
People from San Juan County, New Mexico
20th-century Native Americans
21st-century Native Americans
20th-century Native American women
21st-century Native American women